Leptospermum grandiflorum is a species of shrub or small tree that is endemic to eastern Tasmania.

Description

Taxonomy and naming
Leptospermum grandiflorum was first formally described in 1821 by the British nurserymen Joachim, George and William Loddiges in their journal, The Botanical Cabinet.

Distribution and habitat
This tea-tree grows on granite rocks in eastern Tasmania, mostly on or near the Freycinet Peninsula.

References

grandiflorum
Myrtales of Australia
Flora of Tasmania
Plants described in 1821